The Bathurst Advocate was a weekly English language broadsheet newspaper published in Bathurst, New South Wales, Australia.

History
This newspaper was first published on 5 February 1848 by Benjamin Isaacs, possibly with financial support from Geoffrey Amos Eagar, an accountant. Isaacs had previously set up two newspapers in Parramatta, New South Wales, as well as one in New Zealand. 
After 10 issues of the paper had been published, its subscribers numbered 70.  Only 87 issues of the paper were published, the last being number 39 of Volume 2, which was published on 29 September 1849. The short life span of the newspaper has been attributed to two libel actions which were brought against the editor in 1849.

During that year the paper regularly published criticisms of the local police, and in particular the Chief Constable, John Davies. A poem published by the paper resulted in a libel action by Davies. In reporting the libel action in the newspaper, Isaacs re-published the verses which had sparked the court action, thus leading to a second action.

Before the libel suits came to court, Isaacs sold the Advocate's press, types and building to William Farrand for £450. Farrand then started up the Bathurst Free Press newspaper, publishing the first issue on 6 October 1849. Isaacs was imprisoned for two months and was fined £40 1s.

Digitisation
The paper has been digitised as part of the Australian Newspapers Digitisation Program of the National Library of Australia.

See also
 List of newspapers in New South Wales
 List of Newspapers in Australia
 List of Defunct Newspapers of Australia

References

External links
 
 Press timeline: Select chronology of significant Australian press events to 2011 
 The birth of the newspaper in Australia 
 Isaacs, Victor, Kirkpatrick, Rod and Russell, John (2004). Australian Newspaper History: A Bibliography  
 Isaacs, Victor; Kirkpatrick, Rod, Two hundred years of Sydney newspapers: A short history, Rural Press Ltd

Publications established in 1848
Publications disestablished in 1849
Bathurst, New South Wales
Bathurst Advocate